Lucy Chege (born November 15, 1976) is a volleyball player from Kenya. She has captained the Kenya women's national volleyball team. She has played in the FIVB Volleyball Women's World Championship. In Kenya, she represents the Kenya Pipeline volleyball club.

References

1976 births
Living people
Kenyan women's volleyball players
Place of birth missing (living people)
20th-century Kenyan women